Loralai, also known as Bori, is the division headquarter of Loralai Division and district headquarter of Loralai District. It is in the northeastern part of Balochistan province in Pakistan.

Demography

Notable people
 Raaj Kumar, Bollywood actor

Locations

See also
Loralai District
Pakistan Coal Mines and Resources
Baran Khan Kudezai

Notes

References

External links 
 Government of Balochistan
 Balochistan High Court
 Govt. of Balochistan

Populated places in Loralai District
Loralai District